Jean Maréchal (27 February 1910 – 23 December 1993) was a French racing cyclist, who was professional from 1929 to 1947. He rode in the 1931 Tour de France. He also won the 1930 Paris–Tours.

Major results
1928
 1st Paris–Soissons
1929
 1st Paris–Soissons
 7th Paris–Roubaix
1930
 1st Paris–Tours
 2nd Paris–Roubaix
1931
 1st Critérium des As
1932
 3rd Critérium des As
1934
 6th Bordeaux–Paris
1940
 5th Critérium National

References

External links
 

1910 births
1993 deaths
French male cyclists
Sportspeople from Orléans
Cyclists from Centre-Val de Loire